Ryan is a populated place in Fleming County, Kentucky, United States.

References

Populated places in Fleming County, Kentucky